Bajeko Sekuwa means ‘Grandfather’s Barbecue' is a Nepali restaurant chain. It was founded by Dinanath Bhandari, opened its first outlet at Sinamangal, Kathmandu. The restaurant serves sekuwas and typical Nepalese cuisine made with a proprietary mix of spices. Bajeko Sekuwa currently has 10 restaurants in operation with five fully owned outlets and rest under franchise model and has expanded its outlets in Chitwan and Pokhara.

History
It was established by Dinanath Bhandari as a roadside food stall close to the Tribhuvan International Airport. The name came from the founder itself as the customers used to refer to Bhandari as Baje which later became the brand name of the restaurant. Bajeko Sekuwa opened its first outlet at Sinamangal, kathmandu followed by other at different locations in the capital.

Bajeko Masala
Bajeko Masala produces and distributes varieties of packaged spices including Barha Masala, Green Masala, Chicken Masala, Meat Masala, Sekuwa Masala, Curry Masala, Chicken Masala, and Garam Masala. Only the head chefs and founder knows all the ingredients. The dish was the foundation of the business that started four decades ago in Nepal.

Bajeko Venture
Bajeko Venture is a business model to provide franchising of Bajeko Sekuwa restaurant. It provides the ownership and operational rights of Bajeko Sekuwa to the individuals for growth and development.

References

External links
Official website

Companies based in Kathmandu
Restaurant chains
Tourism in Kathmandu